Ève Salvail (born April 7, 1971) is a Canadian model.

Biography
Salvail was born in Matane, Quebec. While modeling in Japan in the early 1990s she made the decision to shave her head bald and have a Chinese dragon tattooed on her scalp. Her distinctive look was spotted by Jean Paul Gaultier and soon she became a top model in the European fashion capitals.

She would often grow her hair and dye it blonde, red or even pink. For the last few years she has sported very short blonde hair and moved away from modeling but occasionally has had her head shaved in recent years.

Salvail appeared as herself in the Robert Altman film Prêt-à-Porter. She also made appearances in The Fifth Element and Zoolander. She has appeared on the covers of several magazines including ELLE, Marie Claire and Wired.  Salvail also appeared in a Lenny Kravitz music video "Is There Any Love in Your Heart".

Salvail publicly came out as a lesbian on the January 9, 2007 episode of the Tyra Banks Show titled "Coming Out Stories". She also made an appearance on Tyra's show America's Next Top Model where she talked to the girls of Cycle 6 about how her career got started.

For some time she was the lead singer in a band Ten Watt Mary. She has also collaborated with Bryan Adams. In more recent years Eve Salvail has been working as a DJ in New York, often using the name DJ Evalicious.

In 2011 she returned to big time modelling appearing in a shoot for a Jean-Paul Gaultier exhibition in Montreal and later returned to the catwalk for his 2011/12 haute couture Fall Winter 2011/12 show in Paris. For this she had her head completely shaved again returning to the bald, tattooed look when she was a Gaultier muse in the mid 90s.

References

External links
 
 
  Interview for Pony Ryder

1971 births
Canadian film actresses
Female models from Quebec
French Quebecers
Lesbian models
Living people
People from Matane
Canadian lesbian actresses
20th-century Canadian LGBT people
21st-century Canadian LGBT people